Karāmat ʿAlī Jaunpūrī (12 June 1800 – 30 May 1873), born as Muḥammad ʿAlī Jaunpūrī, was a nineteenth-century Indian Muslim social reformer and founder of the Taiyuni movement. He played a major role in propagating to the masses of Bengal and Assam via public sermons, and has written over forty books. Syed Ameer Ali is among one of his notable students.

Early life and family
Muhammad Ali Jaunpuri was born in the neighbourhood of Mulla Tola in Jaunpur, North India on 18 Muharram 1215 A. H. (12 June 1800 CE). It is claimed that he was the 35th direct descendant of Abu Bakr, the first Rashidun caliph, with his ancestors migrating from Baghdad to Jaunpur in the early 19th century. His father, Abu Ibrahim Shaykh Muhammad Imam Bakhsh, was the only son of Shaykh Jarullah and Musammat Jamila Bibi. Bakhsh was a student of Shah Abdul Aziz and was employed as a sheristadar at the Jaunpur Collectorate. Jaunpuri's mother, Musammat Bati Bibi, was the daughter of Shaykh Lutf-e-Ali. His younger brother, Shah Rab Ali Jaunpuri, was a faqir and khalifah of Syed Ahmad Shaheed.

It is said that the name Karamat was later prefixed to his name as people started to notice his karamat. From his own books, it can be seen that he used to refer to himself as simply ‘Ali Jaunpuri’ or ‘Ali Jaunpuri better known as Karamat Ali’.

His lineage is recorded as follows: He is Ali, bin Abu Ibrahim Muhammad Imam Bakhsh, bin Jarullah, bin Gul Muhammad, bin Najib ad-Din, bin Muhammad Fazil, bin Muhammad Ali, bin Abu Muhammad, bin Abdullah, bin Abu al-Fath, bin Hamid, bin Muhammad Hafiz, bin Sayadullah Hafiz, bin Hafiz, bin Burhan ad-Din, bin Khwaja Ashraf, bin Khwaja Najib, bin Khwaja Sayfullah, bin Khwaja Shams ad-Din, bin Khwaja Bayazid, bin Khwaja Abdullah, bin Khwaja Sufi, bin Khwaja Muzaffar, bin Khwaja Mus'ab, bin Khwaja Sayf ad-Din, bin Khwaja Nasir ad-Din, bin Khwaja Abu Saham, bin Khwaja Abu Ali, bin Khwaja Umar, bin Khwaja Ibrahim, bin Khwaja Ahmad. Khwaja Ahmad is claimed to have been a son of Muhammad ibn Abi Bakr although this is not attested.

Education
Jaunpuri's early education in Arabic and Persian began with his father, and he later started Hadith studies and other Islamic studies under Qudratullah Radaulvi and Ahmadullah Anami. He studied reasoning with Ahmad Ali Abbasi Chiraiyakoti and was taught tajweed and Qur'an by Qari Sayyid Ibrahim Madani and Qari Sayyid Muhammad Iskandarani, eventually mastering all seven qira'at. Jaunpuri was also taught Nastaliq and Tughra calligraphy by Hafiz Abdul Ghani to such a degree that it was said he could write Al-Ikhlas with the basmala on a piece of rice and leave space to write his name as well. Apart from this, he also learned the martial arts and wrestling and the art of running sticks and knots from expert art teachers. Jaunpuri studied fiqh under Shah Abdul Aziz and Shah Ismail Dehlvi.

At the age of eighteen, Jaunpuri became interested in tasawwuf. After taking his father's permission, Jaunpuri pledged bay'ah to Sayyid Ahmad of Raebareli, who was the founder of the Tariqah-e-Muhammadiya movement. On the very first week of service, Sayyid Ahmad instructed him to get involved in the work of guidance and bestowed the Khilafah (succession) letter with the spiritual genealogy through Shah Ismail Dehlvi.

Activism in Jaunpur

His religious activities were spread across northern India in places like Jaunpur, Azamgarh, Sultanpur, Ghazipur and Faizabad. At that time, there was no daytime adhan in Jaunpur, it could only be heard with the rising and setting of the sun. He reformed this un-Islamic ritual and with great effort issued adhan in mosques. There were also concerns behind the management of the historic Jama Mosque, Jaunpur. Instead of adhan and prayers, the mosque was used for worldly gatherings like baraat, clubbing and marriage ceremonies regardless of religion. Cattle were also tied in some parts of the Jamia Masjid. It continued for many years after until Jaunpuri managed to re-establish the five daily prayers at the mosque. Similarly, after Jamia Masjid Jaunpur, he started a series of Friday sermons which continued for many years after his death. Due to his preaching efforts, attempts were made to kill him several times but he escaped due to his skill in martial arts. He also established Madrasa Hanafia and Madrasat-ul-Quran in Jaunpur for the publication of religious knowledge. The first teacher of Madrasa Hanafia was Abdul Haleem Farangi Mohali (father of Abdul Hai Lucknowi).

Migration to Bengal

Under Sayyid Ahmad's instruction in 1822, Jaunpuri began preaching to the Muslim masses in Bengal and Assam. He played an important role in Arabic, Urdu and Islamic studies in the country. Starting in Calcutta, he travelled to various places including Dhaka, Mymensingh, Dinajpur, Faridpur, Noakhali, Chittagong, Goalpara, Dhubri, Kamrup and Rangpur.

For most of Karamat Ali Jaunpuri's career, he had to sail in Bengal and Assam for religious activities. For this reason, he established a travelling madrasa within a large boat. His students lived in the boat and Jaunpuri used to bear their expenses and teach them there.

Political views
The Tariqa-e-Muhammadiya split into two in 1867 with Jaunpuri leading a faction which came to be known as the Taiyunis. The Taiyunis considered cooperating with the British authorities as the more ideal option rather than rebelling. Karamat Ali Jaunpuri and the Taiyunis were also opponents of Haji Shariatullah's Faraizi movement which declared British India as a Dar al-Harb (house of war) and discarded the Friday prayer and Eid prayers. Instead, he issued a fatwa declaring the colonised territory as a Dar al-Aman as the British government allowed freedom of religion. His fatwa was used by other Muslim scholars as well as Muslim modernists of the subcontinent like Nawab Abdul Latif and later Syed Ahmad Khan to justify their loyalty and cooperation to the British Empire. During his lifetime, Jaunpuri engaged in debate with the Faraizis, most prominently Abdul Jabbar Faraizi. The first debate regarding the Friday prayer was held in Barisal in 1867, and this was followed up by a debate in 1879 by his son Hafiz Ahmad Jaunpuri in Madaripur. Over five thousand people attended the latter event and it was dubbed by Nabinchandra Sen as the Battle of Jumuʿah.

Personal life
Karamat Ali Jaunpuri married four times. He first married a lady of Jaunpur but she later died. He married two women in Noakhali who also died during his lifetime. His fourth wife, originally from North India, settled in Rangpur with him and outlived him.

Works

Jaunpuri has written roughly 46 books. 19 of them were compiled into the three-volume Zakhira-e-Karamat book. The remaining works are scarce. An incomplete list of his works:
 Miftahul Jannat
 Zeenat al-Musalli
 Zeenat al-Qari
 Sharh-e-Hindi Jazari
 Kawkab-e-Durri
 Tarjama-e-Shamail-e-Tirmizi
 Tarjama-e-Mishkat Sharif
 Aqaid-e-Haqqa
 Tazkiratul Aqaid
 Mafizul Huruf
 Qawl ath-Thabit
 Maqami al-Mubtadieen
 Haqq al-Yaqin
 Bay'at-o-Tauba
 Qawl al-Amin
 Murad al-Murideen
 Qawl al-Haq
 Merat al-Haq
 Imtinan al-Qulub
 Mokashifat-e-Rahmat
 Mulakkhas
 Farz-e-Aam
 Hujjat-e-Kateya
 Nur al-Husa
 Zad at-Taqwa
 Kitab-e-Esteqamat
 Nurun Ala Nur
 Rahat-e-Ruh
 Quwwat al-Iman
 Ihqaqul Haqq
 Rafiq as-Salikeen
 Tanweer al-Qulub
 Tazkiyat an-Neswan
 Nasim al-Haramain
 Barahin-e-Kateya
 Maulood-e-Khairul Bariyyah
 Keramatul Haramain
 Qurratul Wiyyun
 Resala-e-Faisala
 Okazatul Mumineen
 Fath-e-Bab-e-Sabiyan
 Dawat-e-Majnun

Death and legacy

During his travels in Rangpur in 1873, Jaunpuri fell ill and subsequently died on 2 Rabi' al-Thani 1290 AH (30 May 1873 CE). He was buried near the Munshipara Jame Mosque in Rangpur.

Jaunpuri left behind 14 children. Two of his sons, Hafiz Ahmad Jaunpuri and Abdul Awwal Jaunpuri gained prominence in Bengal later on.

Disciples
Jaunpuri had hundreds of spiritual successors (khalifas) including:

Hafiz Ahmad Jaunpuri (1834–1899)
Mohammad Abu Bakr Siddique of Furfura Darbar Sharif (1865–1943)
Maulvi Sarfaraz Ali of Delhi (fl. 1857)
Qari Muhammad Jawed Bakht of Chhatak, Sunamganj
Nadiruzzaman Bhuiyan of Kaliganj, Gazipur
Munshi Azimuddin Hanafi of Karimganj, Kishoreganj
Qazi Muhammad Sami of Rangpur
Ashraf Ali Majumdar of Barsala, Sylhet (1817–1883) 
Moulvi Qudratullah of Dhaka

Notes

External links 
Read Miftah-ul-Jannah, Miftah-ul-Khabta and Rafiq-ul-Salikeen in Urdu online

References 

Sangkhipta Islami Bishwakosh, Volume 1, Islamic Foundation Bangladesh

Indian Muslim scholars of Islam
1800 births
1873 deaths
Indian revolutionaries
19th-century Indian Muslims
19th-century Indian educators
People from Jaunpur district
19th-century Muslim theologians
Sunni Muslim scholars of Islam
Hanafis